Hamad Abbas Janahi (born 4 August 1990) is an Emirati tennis player.

Janahi made his ATP main draw debut at the 2008 Dubai Tennis Championships in the doubles draw. Janahi represents the United Arab Emirates in the Davis Cup. He has a 28–25 record at the Davis Cup.

He is currently serving a ban over doping allegations.

References

External links

1990 births
Living people
Emirati tennis players
Doping cases in tennis